The Frisbee is a type of pendulum amusement ride featuring a circular gondola that rotates as it swings back and forth. Riders are seated on the gondola facing inward or outward, depending on the model. On some models, the entire pendulum makes a full 360 degree swing.

Design and operation
A pendulum is suspended between two support frames. Attached to the base of this pendulum is a circular gondola. Riders are seated in the gondola, facing either inwards or outwards. When the ride cycle starts, the gondola begins to rotate. In addition, the pendulum arm begins to swing through an arc, maxing out between 120° and 360° (full revolution).

Variants

UltraMax 
The UltraMax is a type of amusement ride manufactured by Mondial which is like the HUSS Frisbee however passengers face outwards and are sitting one of the four seats on one of the six gondolas as the ride gets higher momentum and eventually starts going upside down. The ride is built with one arm with two supports and then the arm with the gondolas attached. It also uses the same harness as the ones used on the Top Scans.

Installations

* Rotator at Emerald Park does not go full 360° anymore due to people getting sick on it.

Incidents 
In May 2017, greasing material on a KMG Freak Out ride at Barry's Amusements at Portrush in Northern Ireland was dislodged, causing a loud bang and oil to spray over people and the nearby children's roller coaster. Nobody was injured, but the ride remained closed for the rest of the day whilst park staff investigated.

In July 2017, an 18-year old was killed while riding a KMG Fireball (aka Afterburner) ride that malfunctioned at the Ohio State Fair, sending him flying more than 50 feet in the air. Seven others were injured as well. Numerous fairs and exhibitions have either shut down or pulled the Fireball from their attractions in response to the incident.  KMG stated that the malfunction was due to a corroded support beam.

In June 2019, a Zamperla Discovery Revolution ride at Waldameer Park & Water World malfunctioned, resulting in the riders stuck upside down for several minutes. There were no injuries.

References

External links
 Technical specifications available at HUSS Park Attractions website
 Intamin official website
 Details available at Technical Park official website

Upside-down amusement rides
Amusement rides
Pendulum rides
Goods manufactured in Germany